The 2018 Internazionali di Tennis Country 2001 Team was a professional tennis tournament played on clay court. It was the 1st edition of the tournament which was part of the 2018 ATP Challenger Tour. It took place in Padua, Italy between 23 and 29 July 2018.

Singles main-draw entrants

Seeds

 1 Rankings are as of July 16, 2018.

Other entrants
The following players received wildcards into the singles main draw:
  Jacopo Berrettini
  Enrico Dalla Valle
  Christian Garín
  Gian Marco Moroni

The following player received entry into the singles main draw as a special exempt:
  Sergio Gutiérrez Ferrol

The following player received entry into the singles main draw as an alternate:
  Benjamin Bonzi

The following players received entry from the qualifying draw:
  Edoardo Eremin
  Luca Giacomini
  Walter Trusendi
  Agustín Velotti

The following player received entry as a lucky loser:
  Juan Pablo Varillas

Champions

Singles 

  Sergio Gutiérrez Ferrol def.  Federico Gaio 6–2, 3–6, 6–1

Doubles 

  Tomislav Brkić /  Ante Pavić def.  Walter Trusendi /  Andrea Vavassori 6–2, 7–6(7–4).

References

2018 ATP Challenger Tour